Matthew Jonathan Greenbaum (born February 12, 1950) is an American musician, composer and author.

Background 
Born in New York City, Greenbaum studied privately with Stefan Wolpe, and with Mario Davidovsky at the Graduate Center of the City University of New York. He holds a Ph.D. in Composition from the City University of New York Graduate Center (1985), and has served as a professor of music composition at Temple University's Boyer College of Music and Dance since 1998.

Since 1999 Greenbaum has worked with computer animation to create hybrid works of visual music, as well as chamber music with a video component. Greenbaum has also written on Debussy, Schoenberg and Varèse in relation to Wolpe's dialectical and "cubist" approach to musical structure. He is the curator of Amphibian, a new music and video series in the Hi Art Gallery in New York City.

Music 
Greenbaum's most significant work is Nameless, a 25-minute wordless psalm for three sopranos and two chamber ensembles. It was composed for the Momenta Quartet and the Cygnus Ensemble, and bears a quotation from the Medieval Jewish philosopher Moses Maimonides.

Awards 
Greenbaum's awards include the following:
 Mary Flagler Charitable Trust Award Recording Award, 2008
 Es ist zum Lachen: Commission, Serge Koussevitzky Fund/Library of Congress for Ensemble Surplus (Freiburg), 2007
 Academy Awards: American Academy of Arts and Letters, 2005
 Crossing Brooklyn Ferry: Fromm Music Foundation commission 1994
 Amulet for piano, commissioned by Meet the Composer/Reader's Digest Commission for a consortium of pianists (Gilbert Kalish, Marc-André Hamelin, David Holzman, Randall Hodgkinson, Kathleen Supové and Anthony De Mare) and WGBH-Boston 1989
 Fellowship, New York Foundation for the Arts, 1986
 John Simon Guggenheim Foundation award, 1984
 Chamber Music: Martha Baird Rockefeller Fund for Recordings, 1982

Selected works

Solo instrument 
 Double Song for viola sola: In memoriam Milton Babbitt (2011)
 Chaconne by Attrition for solo violin (2006)
 You Crack Me Up for piano solo (2012)
 Ballate for solo piano (2005)
 Mute Dance for solo guitar (2000)
 Elegy for solo piano (1998)
 Amulet for solo piano (1990)

Solo instrument with piano 
 Untimely Observations for viola and piano (2002)
 Dance Moments for flute/violin and piano (2000)
 Nod Quiet Ox for oboe and piano (1994)
 On the river the shadowy group for baritone sax and piano (1993)

Chamber music 
 More Venerable Canons for string quartet (2014)
 Venerable Canons for flute and violin (2007)
 Es ist zum Lachen for oboe, trombone, violin, cello, percussion and piano (2008) (commissioned by Ensemble Surplus and the Serge Koussevitzky Fund/Library of Congress
 Castelnau for string quartet (2002)
 Enharmonicon for clarinet trumpet and violin (1994)

Chamber music with voice 
 Entretiens sur la pluralité des mondes for soprano and two guitars (2014)
 West-Östicher Divan (2010) for soprano and 2 guitars (2010)
 Wild Rose, Lily, Dry Vanilla for soprano, flute, oboe, violin, cello, guitar and banjo (2004)
 Psalter for mezzo, alto flute, English horn, string trio harp and piano (1992)

Orchestral music 
 The Jig is Up for oboe and string orchestra (2009)
 Nameless for three sopranos, alto flute, English horn, violin, cello guitar and mandolin and string quartet (2009)
 Spherical Music for piano and chamber orchestra (1995)

Theater works 
 A Floating Island, chamber opera for soprano, saxophone, harpsichord, percussion and dancers (2000)

Visual music (video animation and electronic sound) 
 I saw the Procession of the Empress on First Avenue (2014)
 Automat (2012)
 Headshot (2012)
 23 Skidoo (2011)
 On Broadway (2008)

With instruments/voice 
 Leviathan for trombone and video animation (2016)
 Effacement for piano and video animation (2014)
 Bits and Pieces for saxophone and video animation (2012)
 Rope and Chasm for mezzo-soprano and video animation (2010–13)

Recordings 
 Double Song for viola sola, a contribution to Perspectives of New Musics memorial to Milton Babbitt, Spring 2012
 Nameless and other Works: Furious Artisans Recordings; The Cygnus Ensemble and the Momenta Quartet, with sopranos Priscilla Herreid, Elizabeth Farnum and Julie Bishop, mezzo-soprano Re'ut Ben Ze'ev, and violinist Miranda Cuckson
Nameless for three sopranos, alto flute, English horn, violin, cello guitar and mandolin and string quartet (2009)
 Wild Rose, Lily, Dry Vanilla for mezzo-soprano, flute, oboe, violin, cello, guitar and banjo
 Chaconne by Attrition for violin alone
 Venerable Canons for flute and violin
 Psalter and other works, Centaur #2789
 Psalter, Joyce Castle/Parnassus
 Prospect Retrospect for cello and piano: Fred Sherry/Blair McMillen
 from A Floating Island: Cyndie Bellen-Berthézène
 Castelnau for string quartet: The Momenta Quartet
 Elegy: David Holzman, piano
 Untimely Observations for viola and piano: Stephanie Griffin/Blair McMillen
 Nod Quiet Ox for oboe and piano: Fabian Menzel and Bernhard Endres. Antes/Bella Musica
 Amulet, for piano solo: David Holzman, Centaur CRC 2291
 Chamber Music, for flute, cello and piano: The Contemporary Trio re-release. New World NWCRL513

Articles 
Greenbaum is the author of the following articles:
 "Dialectic in Miniature: Schoenberg's 'Sechs Kleine Klavierstücke Op. 19.'" Ex Tempore (Summer 2010)
 "Surrealism in New York." New Music Jukebox (American Music Center) (Fall 2009)
 "Debussy, Wolpe and Dialectical Form." Contemporary Music Review: Stefan Wolpe Issue (Spring 2008)
 "The Proportions of Density 21.5: Wolpean Symmetries in the Music of Edgard Varèse", On the Music of Stefan Wolpe. Austin Clarkson, ed. Pendragon (Hillsdale, New York: 2003)
 "Stefan Wolpe's Dialectical Logic: A Look at the 'Second Piece for Violin Alone' ", Perspectives of New Music, vol. 40, no. 2 (2002)
 Stefan Wolpe, "On Proportions" trans. Matthew Greenbaum. Perspectives of New Music 34/2 (1996)

References 

1950 births
Living people
Musicians from New York City
City University of New York alumni
American classical composers
American male classical composers
Composers for piano
Jewish composers
Modernist composers
20th-century classical composers
21st-century classical composers
20th-century American composers
21st-century American composers
20th-century American male musicians
21st-century American male musicians